Kirkcaldy High School is a 6-year co-educational comprehensive state school in Kirkcaldy, Fife, Scotland.

History 

The school was established in 1582 as Kirkcaldy Burgh School; the "High School" name dates from the middle part of the 19th century. The school's motto is Usque conabor, "I will strive to my utmost".

The High School was originally on St Brycedale Avenue and part of the old building is now incorporated into Kirkcaldy College. In 1958 a new school was built on Dunnikier Way in the shape of a 'H' and opened by Queen Elizabeth II. In 1970 the last entrance exams for the school were taken after which pupils were zoned into their nearest high school. The following year Templehall High School (about half a mile away) became the "Junior" building of the High School originally accommodating 1st, 2nd & 3rd year pupils (later just 1st and 2nd years). The original high school became home for the seniors. As requirements changed over the years the senior school was extended and pupil numbers declined. The requirement for two buildings was no longer necessary. In 1994 the junior building was closed and demolished; the site is now occupied by a housing estate.

The most recent inspection of the school took place in 2012. The reports stated that the school was making good progress with its goals and identified key strengths: pupils who were proud of their school and positive about learning, high achievement in out-of-class learning, high quality pastoral care, very good community partnership working, staff who listened to and involved pupils, and the headteacher's leadership of an improving school.

In March 2014, the school won the COSLA (Convention of Scottish Local Authorities) Excellence Award for its work in relation to teenage sexual health and pregnancy prevention. Working with NHS Fife, the school was recognised as being an example of best practice in this field and was featured in the national press, TV and radio.

Later in 2014, Kirkcaldy High School was shortlisted as a finalist in the Scottish Education Awards 2014 in the Health and Wellbeing section and were selected as the "Kingdom FM" Best School in their "Local Hero" Awards in August 2014.

During session 2015–2016, the school was increasingly involved in promoting "STEM" (Science, Technology, Engineering and Maths) Education, with a staff member being recognised as UK STEM Teacher of the Year, the school winning the Scottish finals of the Engineering Development Trust's "Go4SET" competition and another finalist place in the Scottish Education Awards

On 22 February 2017, the school received a visit from Stonewall Ambassador Sir Ian McKellen.  Sir Ian spoke to the S6 about his experiences before having lunch with the school LGBT+ Group.  Sir Ian was awarded a Kirkclady High School tie which he wore on The Graham Norton Show.

In 2018, the school won a second COSLA Excellence Award for their work tackling LGBT+ bullying and promoting equality across the school as well as taking training to a number of local and national organisations.

In 2020, the school was awarded "Gold" status as a UNICEF "Rights Respecting School" and was awarded the "Gold" Charter by LGBT Youth Scotland.

House system

The pupils of Kirkcaldy High School are organised into four different houses. Originally the House system was named after areas of Kirkcaldy – Balwearie, Raith, Ravenscraig & St. Serfs. Now the houses are named after famous persons of the town.

Oswald (green) – Named after an old Kirkcaldy family, at one time associated with the Dunnikier estate, on which the school is now sited.
Adam Smith (purple) – Named after the economist who wrote The Wealth of Nations and attended the school in the eighteenth century.
Carlyle (blue) – Named after the writer Thomas Carlyle who taught at the school between 1816 and 1818.

Former rectors

Derek Allan: 2009–2022

Notable former pupils

Gordon Aikman, motor neurone disease campaigner
Gordon Brown, former UK Prime Minister
John Buchan, author
David Raitt Robertson Burt, zoologist
Bob Carruthers, filmmaker and author
Harry Colville, footballer
William Barron Coutts FRSE, military scientist
Ewan Dow, politician
Douglas Dryburgh, Olympic curler
Murray Elder, Baron Elder, life peer and political chief of staff
Robert Fyfe, actor
Harry Gourlay, politician
John Grahl, economist
Sandy Hinshelwood, rugby international
Archie Howie, physicist
Bob Howie, rugby international
Dave Howie, rugby international
William Oliphant Hutchison, painter
Jackie Leven, musician
Val McDermid, novelist
Alan Ormrod, cricketer
Richard Park, broadcaster
Aileen Paterson, author
Harry Ritchie, author
Meg Ritchie, Olympic athlete
Anneila Sargent, astronomer
Adam Smith, economist
Shirley-Anne Somerville, politician
R.C. Stevenson, rugby player
Melissa Terras, professor
Brian Thomson, journalist
Andrew Weir, 1st Baron Inverforth, industrialist
Bertha Wilson, Canadian Supreme Court Judge

References

External links
Official school site
Kirkcaldy High School's page on Scottish Schools Online
Kirkcaldy High School on Twitter

Secondary schools in Fife
Educational institutions established in 1852
Kirkcaldy
1852 establishments in Scotland